The Novgorod Oblast Duma is the regional parliament of Novgorod Oblast, a federal subject of Russia. The parliament consists of a total of 32 deputies who are elected for five-year terms. The parliament's seat is in the city of Veliky Novgorod.

Composition

2021

References

External links
 

Novgorod
Politics of Novgorod Oblast